The 1991 RTHK Top 10 Gold Songs Awards was held in 1991 for the 1990 music season.

Top 10 song awards
The top 10 songs (十大中文金曲) of 1991 are as follows.

Other awards

References
 RTHK top 10 gold song awards 1991

RTHK Top 10 Gold Songs Awards
Rthk Top 10 Gold Songs Awards, 1991
Rthk Top 10 Gold Songs Awards, 1991